The Mindsweep: Hospitalised is a remix album by English rock band Enter Shikari, released on 30 October 2015. It featured remixes from drum and bass London-based label Hospital Records artists of songs taken from the band's fourth studio album The Mindsweep.

Track listing

Charts

References

2015 remix albums
Enter Shikari albums
Ambush Reality albums
Hospital Records albums